SS Minnetonka was a combination ocean liner and cargo operated by the Atlantic Transport Line in North Atlantic service during the 1920s and 1930s.

Minnetonka was built by Harland & Wolff and entered service in May 1924, sailing between London and New York City.  She operated for only nine years before being laid up in 1933 and scrapped the following year in Bo'ness, Scotland.

She had a passenger capacity of 369, all in first class.

References

Ships built by Harland and Wolff
1924 ships
Ocean liners of the United Kingdom